Winifred Clements (also Tembe) is a fictional character from the BBC soap opera Doctors, portrayed by Lorna Laidlaw. She is introduced on 5 January 2011 as a new receptionist at the fictional Mill Health Centre as a replacement for Ruth Pearce (Selina Chilton). Despite initially being introduced as Mrs Tembe, she later reveals her forename to be Winifred. In April 2016, Mrs Tembe's role within Doctors changed, as she becomes the practice manager. On 8 January 2019, it was announced that Laidlaw was to leave Doctors after 8 years. Mrs Tembe's exit storyline saw her move away with Gordon Clements (Steven Elder) to Newcastle after accepting a new job working as a manager for a children's charity. Laidlaw's final scenes aired on 13 February 2019.

Storylines
Mrs. Tembe is introduced as a proud native of Botswana with deep Christian values. She impresses Julia Parsons (Diane Keen) at her interview and instantly gets the job as receptionist at the Mill Health Centre. Mrs. Tembe suffers racist bullying from her neighbour Trevor Waterhouse (Laurence Saunders). Trevor, who is a single father struggling to cope, has been radicalised by the British Pride Party, and blames Mrs. Tembe for his unemployment and failings as a father. Mrs. Tembe befriends Trevor's son, Cameron (Charlie Kenyon), which Trevor is not pleased about. Trevor turns neighbours against Mrs. Tembe, blaming her for the food poisoning Cameron gets from jam, saying it was her African food. After many weeks of racism, Mrs. Tembe confronts Trevor and upset, she is comforted by colleague Heston Carter (Owen Brenman), who like all the staff at the Mill, are unaware of what Mrs. Tembe has been enduring for the past weeks. Mrs. Tembe tells Heston that she feels unsafe in the United Kingdom and she moves back to Botswana without telling anybody at the Mill.

Mrs. Tembe returns to the Mill months later. She returns recovered from her racial attacks, and is welcomed back by the staff, who are pleased to see her, except for temporary receptionist Lauren Porter (Alexis Peterman), who is now out of a job. She goes out of her way to make Mrs. Tembe's life miserable and upsets her, which results in the pair having a huge argument after Mrs. Tembe learns about Lauren's schemes. In the heat of the moment, Mrs. Tembe told Lauren that she wishes her dead, and storms off. That night, Lauren is murdered. Due to their unprofessional manner in the staffroom, Mrs. Tembe and Lauren both have to attend a meeting with Julia so they could sort it out, however Lauren does not attend. Eventually, Mrs. Tembe asks Julia if they can visit Lauren to make sure she is alright, as nobody has heard from her in days. When they get there, they are shocked to discover Lauren's dead body on the floor.

Mrs. Tembe begins a friendship with the vicar of her parish church, Gordon Clements (Steven Elder), which blossoms into a romance. It falls apart when Mrs. Tembe's former husband Thomas arrives at the Mill, who the doctors believe is dead. It is revealed that Thomas is gay and that Mrs. Tembe outed him to their family and friends. They subsequently shunned Thomas and he was forced from the town, prompting a heartbroken Mrs. Tembe's emigration to England. Mrs. Tembe is one of many at the Mill to be devastated at Howard's sudden death. When she enters Howard's office alone, she breaks down in tears. Mrs. Tembe is asked by Daniel Granger (Matthew Chambers), Jimmi Clay (Adrian Lewis Morgan) and Heston to run the surgery due to Howard's death. She refuses, but later agrees. Mrs. Tembe later helps an old lady who has been scammed by a builder named Brian Hutchinson (Tim Faraday). She disguises herself to catch the builder out, but he attacks her and leaves her for dead. She is found and taken to hospital. The staff are shocked at Mrs. Tembe's absence and what has happened.

Mrs. Tembe helps the new Practice Manager, Anthony Harker (Adam Astill). He targets her and tells her to go home to Botswana, and Mrs. Tembe replies that her home is in Letherbridge. Anthony continues to bully Mrs. Tembe and it reaches boiling point when he persuades her to accept a new job; so she does and leaves the Mill. When several staff at her new workplace quit, she returns to the Mill as Practice Manager. Mrs. Tembe begins a relationship with JJ Kenwright (Neal Barry), despite her colleagues being skeptical about JJ and his shady past. They try to change the St. Phil's Hospital catering, and after a few months, JJ gets a job offer in Spain. Suggesting that Mrs. Tembe relocates with him, she declines his offer and they break up.

Mrs. Tembe falls out with Heston and they decide to make up by going out to lunch at a pub, accompanied by Al Haskey (Ian Midlane). Mrs. Tembe and Heston share a bottle of wine and Al offers to drive them back to the Mill. However, on the way back, Al gets distracted and crashes the car, leaving all three injured. Mrs. Tembe is the worst injured of the three, as she has trapped air in her ribcage and Al is forced to perform a risky procedure in the car wreckage using the car aerial to save her life. Mrs. Tembe is rushed to hospital in a critical condition and is taken into surgery. She survives, and wakes up in a ward at the hospital with Zara Carmichael (Elisabeth Dermot Walsh) by her side, and asks how Heston is. Knowing he is dead, Zara lies to protect Mrs. Tembe's feelings, but Mrs. Tembe is later told that Heston is dead. As she returns to work, Mrs. Tembe struggles with her grief and becomes short-tempered with her colleagues, who see she has become a different person and is not coping with Heston's death. Mrs. Tembe is angry at God for taking Heston instead of her, and feels like she should have died instead of him, something she admits to his wife, Ruhma Carter (Bharti Patel). On the day of Heston's funeral, Mrs. Tembe is in attendance, but refuses to enter the Church as she is still upset that God took Heston over her. She sits outside for the entire service and at one point, Zara comes outside and tries to persuade her to come in and pay her respects to Heston, but she refuses. Whilst everybody is at the wake, Mrs. Tembe enters the church alone and speaks to God, lecturing him and telling him that it should have been her, not Heston who had a family who loved him. In the following weeks, she continues to struggle to cope with her grief and Heston's death, even having flashbacks of the accident. She announces at the Mill that there will be no Christmas decorations as she feels it is not appropriate due to Heston's death. Al questions her, leading her to call him a hypocrite, due to his dislike of Christmas. Mrs. Tembe is later angry when Al and Valerie decorate the surgery, however she does not say anything, she simply walks out.

After Reverend March is hospitalised with pleurisy, Mrs. Tembe's ex-lover Gordon returns to take over the church. They find a way to forgive each other, and Mrs. Tembe sees that God has seen the hole left in her life by Heston dying and has brought Gordon back into her life, which leads to her forgiving God and regaining her faith. After deciding to train to become a vicar, Mrs. Tembe gets engaged to Gordon and leaves Letherbridge with him after realising she is finally happy. She informs Zara and Daniel that she will be leaving, so the three try to find a suitable replacement, despite Zara voicing that Mrs. Tembe could not be replaced. Mrs. Tembe meets Becky Clarke (Ali Bastian) at a Women in Business meeting and is left impressed. After conducting interviews, Mrs. Tembe, Zara and Daniel offer Becky the post. Mrs. Tembe receives a job offer with a charity working with children in Newcastle, where Gordon would be stationed at, however they would want her to start immediately. On her last day, Mrs. Tembe gives advice to all of her colleagues and is thrown a goodbye party in the Mill staff room by all of her colleagues and friends. After making an emotional speech about her eight years at the Mill and missing Howard and Heston, Mrs. Tembe prepares to leave. After a final conversation with Jimmi in the car park, Mrs. Tembe drives off into the sunset with Gordon.

Development

Relationships
On 5 April 2013, it was revealed that an upcoming storyline would see Mrs Tembe be given a romance with Reverend Gordon portrayed by Steven Elder. Mrs Tembe was given the storyline following Laidlaw telling producers that she wanted her alter ego to have a relationship. Speaking to Inside Soap, Laidlaw said: "I'm so excited someone has the hots for Mrs Tembe, I told the producers I wanted her to fall in love with someone, and now its happening. The audience will see her in a new light."

Following the airing of the romance storyline with Reverend Gordon, Laidlaw told Inside Soap: "Mrs Tembe's romance with Rev Gordon got a phenomenal response. One fantastic comment I saw on Facebook mentioned Mrs T 'fornicating'!" Discussing where things are heading next, she added: "Mrs Tembe is going to go speed-dating - now she's broken that romance barrier with Gordon, there'll be more adventures to come!"

Departure
On 8 January 2019, it was announced that Laidlaw had left Doctors, after 8 years in the role as Mrs Tembe. It was said that she would get a happy ending, which would see her leave The Mill to go and live with Reverend Gordon Clements, who she has recently rekindled her romance with. Laidlaw's exit scenes aired in the episode "Home", broadcast on 13 February 2019. Mrs Tembe left the Mill and Letherbridge for Newcastle with her fiance, Gordon where she accepted a job working for a charity involving children and also training to become a vicar. In an interview with Digital Spy, Laidlaw stated "I left Doctors not knowing what I was going to do. You know when it's time to leave somewhere. The character was just fantastic but I think I'd done as much as I possibly could with her at that moment". Two years after leaving Doctors, Laidlaw was asked what she missed about playing Mrs Tembe. She replied that she missed playing a character with no power in the Mill Health Centre but still running it. She explained that she was fascinated by Mrs Tembe's "gravitas around the place" and being in charge of people.

Reception
Laidlaw was named Best Actress at the 2012 RTS Midlands Awards. In August 2017, Laidlaw was longlisted for Best Daytime Star at the Inside Soap Awards. She progressed to the viewer-voted shortlist. On 6 November 2017, Laidlaw won the Best Daytime Star accolade, which is the first Inside Soap award to be won by Doctors.

References

External links
 Mrs Tembe at BBC Online

Doctors (2000 TV series) characters
Fictional Botswana people
Female characters in television
Fictional managers
Fictional receptionists
Television characters introduced in 2011